Jobs for America's Graduates, or JAG, is a school-to-career program implemented in 1,000 high schools, alternative schools, community colleges, and middle schools across the United States and the United Kingdom. JAG's mission is to keep young people in school through graduation and provide work-based learning experiences that will lead to career advancement opportunities or to enroll in a post-secondary institution that leads to a rewarding career.  JAG is a U.S. national non-profit corporation established in 1980 for the purpose of assisting state affiliates in building a statewide organizations to achieve the goals of the program. It was started by Pete DuPont, then Governor of Delaware, and Kenneth M. Smith.

JAG's national headquarters is located in Alexandria, Virginia.

References

External links
JAG website

Employment in the United States
Non-profit organizations based in Alexandria, Virginia
Organizations established in 1980
1980 establishments in Delaware